Thomas Grahamslaw  (3 March 1901 – 16 December 1973) was an Australian public servant. He spent most of his life in Papua and New Guinea, where he worked as a civil servant and served as an official member of the Legislative Council.

Biography
Grahamslaw was born in Townsville in 1901, the eldest of six children of Annie (née Meldon) and James Grahamslaw. His father was a tinsmith who had immigrated from Scotland, while his mother had been born in Australia. The family moved to the Territory of Papua in 1911, with Grahamslaw attending school in Port Moresby.

He left school at the age of 14 to work as a grocer's boy at the British New Guinea Development Company shop. In 1916 he joined the territory's civil service as a cadet clerk. He was appointed Acting Collector of Customs in Daru in 1924, later becoming moving to Woodlark Island, where his roles included gaoler inspector of native labour and mining registrar, and then Samarai where was postmaster and collector of customs. He married May McLean in Port Moresby in 1939 and became fluent in several indigenous languages.

During World War II Grahamslaw joined Australian New Guinea Administrative Unit and was appointed as a district officer for Northern District. Having walked from the north to the south coast of New Guinea alone following the Japanese invasion, he helped prepare Australian soldiers for the Kokoda Track campaign. He was temporarily promoted to major and was awarded an OBE in 1943 for his efforts during the Battle of Buna–Gona. In 1943 he transferred to the Australian Imperial Force, and in early 1944 was given responsibility for Lakekaum district, before taking over the administration of a much larger area later in the year. In 1945 he was promoted to lieutenant colonel, remaining in the army until being demobilised in February 1946.

Following the war, Grahamslaw rejoined the civil service, becoming Superintendent of Stores and then Assistant Collector of Customs in 1949. Following the death of Chief Collector of Customs Thomas Byrne in February 1952, he became Acting Chief Collector of Customs, also serving in the Legislative Council until Frank Lee was appointed as Byrne's permanent replacement later in the year.

In 1955 Grahamslaw succeeded Lee as Collector of Customs, and rejoined the Legislative Council. In 1960 he was also appointed to the Executive Council. He retired the following year and moved to New South Wales. His first marriage having ended in divorce, he married Mary Emilie Chase in October 1961. He died in December 1973 in Gosford.

References

1901 births
People from Townsville
Territory of Papua people
Australian public servants
Papua New Guinean civil servants
Australian Officers of the Order of the British Empire
Australian Army personnel of World War II
Members of the Legislative Council of Papua and New Guinea
1973 deaths
Australian colonels